Paula Gately Tillman (born 1946) is a photographer from Baltimore, Maryland. In the 1980s and 1990s she documented underground scenes and fringe personalities in New York and Atlanta.

Her work is held in the permanent collections of the Baltimore Museum of Art, New York University's Fales Library, the Stuart A. Rose Manuscript, Archives, and Rare Book Library at Emory University, and the Sheridan Libraries, Special Collections, Johns Hopkins University.

Career
Gately Tillman studied photography in Aspen, Colorado under the guidance of photographer Eileen Lewis. She moved to New York to take classes at the School of Visual Arts and to pursue a career as a photographer. In 1984 a chance meeting with Brant Mewborn, senior editor of Rolling Stone, led to her introduction to the musicians, drag queens, fashion divas, and other collaborators that she would photograph. During her combined time in New York and Atlanta, her subjects included The American Music Show, RuPaul, Phoebe Legere, Michael Musto, Tish and Snooky Bellomo (Manic Panic), Lady Miss Kier, Wigstock, John Kelly, Lady Bunny, Nelson Sullivan, Joey Arias, Dick Richards (American Music Show), Fenton Bailey, Randy Barbato, Larry Tee and others.

In December 2018 Tillman released her first monograph, Fringe, that highlighted her photographic work from the 1980s and 1990s. Her book also includes a short memoir. Five of the photographs from Fringe were curated into A Look Back: 50 Years After Stonewall, July 12–August 11, 2019, at Fort Gansevoort, a gallery located in a renovated building (which was Nelson Sullivan's personal residence in the 1980s) in the Meatpacking District in New York City.

Personal life
Tillman is the widow of LeRoy E. Hoffberger, attorney, art collector, author, and philanthropist.

Collections
Tillman's work is held in the following permanent collections:
Baltimore Museum of Art
New York University's Fales Library
The Stuart A. Rose Manuscript, Archives, and Rare Book Library at Emory University
The Sheridan Libraries, Special Collections, Johns Hopkins University

References

External links 
 Stuart A. Rose Manuscript, Archives, and Rare Book Library, Emory University: Paula Gately Tillman papers, 1986-2013

1946 births
Living people
Artists from Baltimore
American women photographers
21st-century American women